St Mary's Church, Woodford is the ancient parish church for Woodford in east London, on the High Road in what is now South Woodford in the London Borough of Redbridge. It is known to have existed by the 12th century. Its rector in the 1520s was John Larke. Its medieval west tower and spire were in dangerously poor repair by 1705 and in 1708 it was replaced with a brick tower The medieval church was substantially rebuilt in brick in the Gothic style in 1816. Population expansion led to the construction of the new churches of St Paul's in 1854 and All Saints in 1874, both within the parish.

Prior to a 1969 arson attack, the interior of St Mary's contained several wall monuments and tombs, including the tomb of Bridget, widow of Alexander Staples and eldest daughter of Sir John Ernle, Chancellor of the Exchequer to Charles II and James II. The current interior is modern.  The church is fitted with a 3-manual Grant, Degens and Bradbeer Organ which was built at a similar time to the organ of New College Oxford. The church was completely rebuilt in 1971-72.

The churchyard hosts one of the Great Trees of London, a Copper Beech.

References

Mary's